Verila Glacier on Livingston Island in the South Shetland Islands, Antarctica is situated southeast of southern Etar Snowfield, southwest of Berkovitsa and Tundzha Glaciers, and west of Kamchiya Glacier. It is bounded by Rotch Dome to the west, Casanovas Peak and Snow Peak to the north, and Ustra Peak to the southeast. The glacier's bedrock is connected to Kaliman Island in Walker Bay by a 600 m long moraine tombolo. The area was visited by 19th century British and American sealers.

The feature is named after Verila Mountain in Western Bulgaria.

Location

See also
 List of glaciers in the Antarctic
 Glaciology

Maps
 Chart of South Shetland including Coronation Island, &c. from the exploration of the sloop Dove in the years 1821 and 1822 by George Powell Commander of the same. Scale ca. 1:200000. London: Laurie, 1822
 L.L. Ivanov et al. Antarctica: Livingston Island and Greenwich Island, South Shetland Islands. Scale 1:100000 topographic map. Sofia: Antarctic Place-names Commission of Bulgaria, 2005.
 L.L. Ivanov. Antarctica: Livingston Island and Greenwich, Robert, Snow and Smith Islands. Scale 1:120000 topographic map. Troyan: Manfred Wörner Foundation, 2010.  (First edition 2009. )
 Antarctic Digital Database (ADD). Scale 1:250000 topographic map of Antarctica. Scientific Committee on Antarctic Research (SCAR). Since 1993, regularly upgraded and updated.
 L.L. Ivanov. Antarctica: Livingston Island and Smith Island. Scale 1:100000 topographic map. Manfred Wörner Foundation, 2017.

In fiction

Verila Glacier is part of the mise-en-scène in the 2016 Antarctica thriller novel The Killing Ship by Simon Beaufort, with action spreading westwards from Hannah Point, skirting the glacier and eventually reaching Byers Peninsula; the glacier is shown on a sketch map of Livingston Island illustrating the book.

Notes

References
 Verila Glacier SCAR Composite Antarctic Gazetteer
 Bulgarian Antarctic Gazetteer. Antarctic Place-names Commission. (details in Bulgarian, basic data in English)

External links
 Verila Glacier. Copernix satellite image

Glaciers of Livingston Island